Ferdinand Charles (17 May 1628 – 30 December 1662) was the Archduke of Further Austria, including Tyrol, from 1646 to 1662.

As the son of Archduke Leopold V and Claudia de' Medici, he succeeded his father upon the latter's death in 1632, under his mother's regency. He took over his mother's governatorial duties when he came of age in 1646. To finance his extravagant living style, he sold goods and entitlements. For example, he wasted the exorbitant sum which France had to pay to the Tyrolean Habsburgs for the cession of their fiefs west of the Rhine (Alsace, Sundgau and Breisach). He also fixed the border to Graubünden in 1652.

Ferdinand Charles was an absolutist ruler, did not call any diet after 1648 and had his chancellor Wilhelm Biener executed illegally in 1651 after a secret trial. On the other hand, he was a lover of music: Italian opera was performed in his court.

Marriage, children and death 
Ferdinand Charles married Anna de' Medici. She was a daughter of Cosimo II de' Medici, Grand Duke of Tuscany and Maria Magdalena of Austria († 1631). They had three children:

Claudia Felicitas of Austria (30 May 1653 – 8 April 1676). Married Leopold I, Holy Roman Emperor.
Daughter (born and died 19 July 1654), died at birth.
Maria Magdalena of Austria (17 August 1656 – 21 January 1669).

He died in Kaltern.

Ancestors

References

External links

A listing of descendants of Maximilian I, Holy Roman Emperor

1628 births
1662 deaths
17th-century archdukes of Austria
Counts of Tyrol
Knights of the Golden Fleece